Shorea contorta (called, along with some other species in the genus Shorea, white lauan) is a species of plant in the family Dipterocarpaceae. It is endemic to the Philippines.

References

contorta
Endemic flora of the Philippines
Trees of the Philippines
Least concern plants
Taxonomy articles created by Polbot